In British politics the Shadow Secretary of State for Justice is the member of the Shadow Cabinet who shadows the Secretary of State for Justice, an office which has existed since 2007.  Prior to 2007, the office was known as Shadow Secretary of State for Constitutional Affairs. The current Shadow Secretary of State for Justice is Steve Reed.

Shadow Secretaries of State

Notes

References

Official Opposition (United Kingdom)